Life Begins Today (Swedish: I dag börjar livet) is a 1939 Swedish drama film directed by Schamyl Bauman and starring Sture Lagerwall, Sonja Wigert and Nils Ohlin. It was shot at the Centrumateljéerna Studios in Stockholm. The film's sets were designed by the art director Arthur Spjuth. It is based on the 1933 play Pétrus by the French writer Marcel Achard.

Synopsis
Wera Holm, a ballerina, waits outside an apartment block with a pistol waiting for the womanising choreographer who has now dropped her for one of the other dancers. She takes two shots at him, misses, and then dives into a nearby apartment of the artist Petrus Sommar. When the choreographer turns up dead, it appears there is someone else who has reason to kill him.

Cast
 Sture Lagerwall as Petrus Sommar, målare
 Sonja Wigert as 	Wera Holm, dansös
 Nils Ohlin as 	Börje Fredin, balettmästare
 Margareta Bergfeldt as Karin, Petrus syster
 Dagmar Ebbesen as 	Moster Johanna
 Axel Högel as 	Morbror Karl
 Barbro Kollberg as Nelly, balettflicka
 Ziri-Gun Eriksson as 	Margot, balettflicka 
 Ingrid Borthen as 	Dittan, balettflicka
 Nils Johannisson as 	Stålhagen, detektiv
 Ivar Kåge as 	Kriminalchefen
 Olga Appellöf as 	Polissystern 
 Naemi Briese as 	Modell 
 Ernst Brunman as 	Polisen vid skrivmaskinen
 Erland Colliander as 	Bartendern 
 Greta Ericson as 	Lola 
 Hartwig Fock as Poliskonstapel Österberg
 Lillebil Kjellén as Balettdansös
 Eivor Landström as 	Kvinnan som söker modelljobb 
 Arne Lindblad as 	Pianisten
 Gerd Mårtensson as	Balettdansös 
 John Norrman as 	Polis 
 Hanny Schedin as 	Servitris

References

Bibliography 
 Qvist, Per Olov & von Bagh, Peter. Guide to the Cinema of Sweden and Finland. Greenwood Publishing Group, 2000.

External links 
 

1939 films
Swedish drama films
1939 drama films
1930s Swedish-language films
Films directed by Schamyl Bauman
Films set in Stockholm
Swedish films based on plays
1930s Swedish films